San Cristóbal District is one of six districts of the province Mariscal Nieto in Moquegua Region, Peru.

History 
San Cristobal District was created by Law 9940 (31 January 1944).

Authorities

Mayors 
 2011-2014: Juan Rogelio Choque Nina. 
 2007-2010: Rogelio Leonardo Vizcarra Taco.

Festivities 
 Corpus Christi

See also 
 Puma Sulu
 Tixani

References

See also 
 Administrative divisions of Peru

External links 
 INEI Peru